The Mfantsefo or Fante ("Fanti" is an older spelling) are an Akan people. The Fante people are mainly located in the Central and Western coastal regions of Ghana. Over the last half century, due to fishing expeditions, Fante communities are found as far as Gambia, Liberia and even Angola.  Major Fante cities in modern Ghana include Kasoa, Winneba, Agona Swedru, Tarkwa, Oguaa (Cape Coast), Edina (Elmina), Mankessim, Sekondi and Takoradi.  

Like all Akans, they originated from Bono state. Originally, "Fante" referred to "the half that left" and broke away from other Akans and initially settled at Mankessim. Some of the states that make up the Fante are Agona, Ahanta, Kurantsi, Abura, Anyan, Ekumfi, Nkusukum, Ajumako and Gomoa. The Fante, like other related Akans, trace their roots to the ancient Sahara in the Old Ghana Empire. The Fante then migrated south to modern-day Techiman in the Brong Ahafo region. It was from here that, legend says, their three great leaders – Oson, Odapagyan and Obrumankoma – led them south and separated from other Akans, to Mankessim. 

The historical and spiritual capital of Mfantseman is Mankessim (Oman kesi mu). The Fante people are one of the largest Akan groups, along with the "Asantefo" or Ashantis, the Akuapem, the Akyem, the Bono, The Kwahu, the Baoule, Nzema, Ahanta and others. Despite the rapid growth of the Ashanti Empire and constant war with the Ashanti and allied Dutch in the mid-1800s, the Fante have always retained their state to this day and fought numerous wars to protect their northern flank from Ashanti incursions and several other wars with the Dutch, and English. Currently, they number about 6 million, the second largest grouping of Akan people or about 13% of modern Ghana's total population. Inheritance and succession to public office among the Fante are traditionally determined by matrilineal descent, which is common among Akan peoples. 

However, Fante males of fighting age traditionally belonged to their father's Asafo company. 

When the Portuguese arrived in the 15th century, the Fante prevented them from venturing inland and leased properties for Portuguese trading missions. But when the Portuguese objected to Fante rules and regulations, the Fante expelled them after a series of skirmishes and battles. Thereafter the Dutch arrived, followed by the British. The Fante served as middlemen in the commerce between the interior and British and Dutch traders on the coast. The Fante became a very wealthy and prosperous state upon their dealings with the various European powers. 

In the early 18th century, the modern Fante Confederacy was formed, with the aim of establishing themselves as a nation to be taken seriously by their European counterparts and the withdrawal of Europeans from Fante lands. The Fantes for centuries already had a very complex system of federal government in which various states co-exist in an alliance. Each Fante state is led by a Paramount Chief. However, in times of war, they always mobilized a Union army often commanded by the Paramount Chief of Abura. Facing such stern resistance, the Portuguese, Germans, Swedish and Danes after many decades vacated all trading forts in Mfantseman. The Dutch decided to stay, leading to many wars between Fante and the Dutch, who failed to colonize them. In 1844, having been weakened by constant battles with the Ashanti and their allies the Dutch, the Fante Confederacy signed the bond of 1844 with the British. The British left Cape Coast and moved the capital of Gold Coast to Accra as a response to the resistance movement. The modern Fante Confederacy was established in response to the threat of Europeans attempting to colonize vast areas within modern-day Ghana. So in 1844, a bond was signed between the Fante Confederacy, on behalf of the Gold Coast, and the British, allowing the Gold Coast to gain total independence without war one hundred years later.  

Several Ashanti-Fante Wars followed, due to the Ashanti quest for direct trade routes to the coast. On one occasion, the Fante were aided by the British, who nevertheless managed to seriously weaken the strong Fante confederation established between 1868 and 1872, believing it a threat to their hegemony on the coast. The British and the Dutch took sides in these Ashanti-Fante wars, with the British supporting the Fante and the Dutch supporting the Ashanti.

While Mfantsefo are known widely to be a peaceful people, in times of war they rally for the common defence. Due to wars with the Dutch and allied Ashanti, the combined strength of the Fante Union Army numbered more than thirty thousand men in 1844. It was under the command of Amfo Otu, Paramount Chief of Abura, that they laid siege to their own town of Elmina and its European castle, eventually expelling the Dutch from their stronghold in Elmina.  

The Fante have produced numerous illustrious and prominent people in Ghana, notable among whom are Kofi Annan (former UN Secretary General); Jacob Wilson Sey (first indigenous multimillionaire on the Gold Coast); British journalist and writer Ekow Eshun; Ottobah Cugoano (abolitionist and natural rights philosopher), Sam Jonah (ex-CEO of AngloGold Ashanti); former president, John Atta Mills, former vice-presidents, Joseph W.S. de Graft-Johnson, Kow Nkensen Arkaah and Kwesi Amissah-Arthur; Peter Turkson (first Ghanaian Cardinal of the Roman Catholic Church) and a number of major advocates of independence, not only in Ghana but also in the West African sub-region and the African diaspora, such as John Mensah Sarbah, James Kwegyir Aggrey, Ottobah Cugoano (Fante-British Slave Abolitionist), Chief Takyi (leader of Jamaican slave revolt), Paa Grant (founding father of the UGCC) and J. E. Casely Hayford. Other notable Fante luminaries include Sir Knight Joseph Panford, the Fante Chief in Koforidua, Eastern Region, who represented the entire Catholic Church of Ghana, in Rome and met Pope John Paul I and was knighted in doing so; Joseph Ellis and Joseph Biney, who both discovered the gold deposits in 1897 situated at Obuasi in the Ashanti region; black navigator Pedro Alonso Niño (1468–c. 1505), also known as El Negro ("The Black"), Spanish-born of African descent, who sailed with Christopher Columbus across the Atlantic in 1492, and whose father was a Fante seaman from Elmina. He explored the coasts of Africa in his early years. He piloted one of Columbus' ships in the expedition of 1492, and accompanied him during his third voyage that saw the discovery of Trinidad and the mouths of the Orinoco River.

Family names 

One of the social contexts of names among the Akan, including the Fante, is that they are used as social tags to indicate personal and group identity. This is so with family names derived from 12 Ntoro patrilineal clans of the fathers that are given to children. Each of the 12 Ntoro patrilineal clans has its peculiar family names. It is thus possible to use one's name to trace his/her patrilineal clan. Children who trace their genealogy to one patrilineal father may therefore share similar family names. Typical family names include Yankah, Osam, Aidoo, etc. There have also been innovations as a result of westernization, education and foreign religion, with multiple names developed out of this phenomenon. Some Fante names were translated literally into English and have endured as family names. Since the Fantes by virtue of living on the coast were the first to be in contact with the Europeans and traded, intermarried and lived with them for over 400 years, it is inevitable that among the Fante names show a greater degree of western influence compared to tribes in the hinterland. Examples of such anglicised transformational name are:

Dua (lit tree/board) – Wood 
Kuntu (blanket ) – son of Kuntu Blankson 
Kumi ba (child of Kumi) – Kumson or Koomson
Kwei ba (child of Kwei) – Quayson, Quayeson, Kweison or Kwaeson
Akorɔma (hawk) – Hawkson 
Nyameba – Godson
ɛbo (stone) – Rockson 
Accordingly, some family names can also be identified by the suffix, for example:
-son as in Yawson
-ful, as in Arkorful, 
-ney, as in Biney.
Otherwise, Fante (Akan) typological family names indicate various contexts. They may be circumstantial, manner of birth, theophorous, weird names, insinuating and proverbial names, gang and nicknames, status, occupational, professional, religious, matrimonial, and western names.  There can be a combination of two or more of these typological names.

Naming system 
Fantes use a system of giving the first name to a child based on the day of the week that the child was born:

Children may also be named according to the sequence in which they are born. The names given are as follows  

Twins may also be named according to the sequence in which they are born. The names given are as follows:

The next child born immediately after the birth of the twins may be given a name, such as:

Origin
According to oral tradition the Fante separated from the other Akan groups in present day Brong Ahafo around 1250 AD. This act became
the origin of their name, "Fa-atsew" meaning "half that left". The Fante left their Akan brethren at Krako, present day Techiman in the Bono East of Ghana, and became their own distinct Akan group. 
The Fante people were led by three great warriors known as Obrumankoma, Odapagyan and Oson (the whale, the eagle and the elephant respectively).

According to tradition,
Obrumankoma and Odapagya died on this exodus and were embalmed and carried the rest of the way. Oson led the people to what would become Mankessim in 1252. Legend has it that the Fante's chief priest, Komfo Amona, planted a spear in the ground when they reached the location of the settlement. The spear is called the Akyin-Enyim, meaning "in front of god". The place became the meeting place for the Fante elders and the head fetish priest when discussing important matters. 

The first Omanhen (king) of Mankessim was installed here, and later kingmakers would visit the site for consultation. According to the Fante, the spear cannot be removed by mortal hands. The land the Fante reached was initially called Adoakyir by its existing inhabitants, which the Fante called "Etsi-fue-yifo" meaning people with bushy hair. The Fante conquered these people and renamed the settlement Oman-kesemu, meaning large town. The name has evolved into the current
name, Mankessim.

The Fante settled the land as their first independent kingdom, and buried Obrumakankoma and Odapagya in a sacred grove called Nana-nom-pow. Komfo Amona also planted the limb of a tree he had brought from the Akan homeland in Krako to see if a place was good for settlement. The day after the priest planted the limb, the people found a tree starting to grow. The tree was named Ebisa-dua, or the consulting tree, and its location is today one of the most important shrines in Mankessim.

Fante dialect
Elmina

Culture 

The Fante engage in farming, fishing and animal husbandry. Fante society is matrilineal.

A majority of the Fante adhere to Christianity or their traditional beliefs. A minority profess Sunni Islam.

Fante people are very well-known for their cuisine. Food plays an integral part of Fante culture and take pride of place. Their traditional food includes Kenkey, Banku (Etsew) that is eaten with fish including Tilapia and other seafood, fresh pepper and vegetables. Many Fante's from the interior also traditionally eat yam and coco yams (ampesie) and fufu. The Oguaa Fetu Afahye (an annual traditional festival celebrated in Cape Coast) is actually a yam harvest festival that was previously celebrated in the Bono Kingdom and was brought to the coast during the exodus. 

Fantes through their long association with Europeans developed a unique blend of culinary dishes that are now eaten all over Ghana including corned beef stew, Ghana Jollof, Ghana meat pie, Ice Kenkey, Atadwe milk, abodoo, jollof rice, foam and many others.

References
Rebecca Shumway. 2011. The Fante and the Transatlantic Slave Trade. Rochester: University of Rochester Press. 

 
Ethnic groups in Ghana
Akan
West African people